The One Who Will Stay Unnoticed is a Croatian drama film directed by Zvonimir Jurić. It was released in 2003.

Cast
 Nataša Dangubić
 Asja Jovanović - (as Asja Potočnjak)
 Daria Lorenci
 Krešimir Mikić - Kreso
 Bojan Navojec
 Rakan Rushaidat

External links
 

2003 films
2000s Croatian-language films
2003 drama films
2003 directorial debut films
Croatian drama films